Crandall Marine Railway is a historic dry dock facility located at Heart's Bay,  southwest of Ticonderoga in Essex County, New York. It was built in September 1927 by the Lake George Steamboat Company as its primary facility for building, repairing and maintaining its fleet. Contributing structures on the property are the head house, tracks and a cradle.

It was listed on the National Register of Historic Places in 2011.

References

External links 
An extensive history of Ticonderoga Railways by Mark Wright, with a section on the Crandall Marine Railway.  See "The Baldwin Marine Railway."

Industrial buildings and structures on the National Register of Historic Places in New York (state)
Transport infrastructure completed in 1927
Transportation buildings and structures in Essex County, New York
National Register of Historic Places in Essex County, New York